István Tótfalusi, born István Tóth, wearing this name until 1960 (Budapest, December 8, 1936 – August 29, 2020) was a Hungarian writer, literary translator, linguist, editor, and a recipient of the Attila József Prize (1997).

Career and work
Between 1955 and 1959 he was a student of Hungarian and English at the School of English and American Studies of the Faculty of Humanities of the Eötvös Loránd University (ELTE BTK). Between 1959 and 1980 and from 1984 to 1996 he was editor-in-charge of the Móra Ferenc Book Publishing House, and between 1981 and 1983, the editor of Interpress Magazine.

He translated poetry, novels, and plays into Hungarian from English, German, Swedish, Norwegian, French, Italian, Spanish, Portuguese, and Latin. He translated into English several poems by Mihály Babits (1988), Milán Füst (1990), János Pilinszky, Gyula Illyés (1995), Péter Kuczka (1996), Ágnes Gergely (1997), Sándor Kányádi (1999), Sándor Weöres (2004), and Lőrinc Szabó (2006) as well as an anthology of contemporary Hungarian poetry (1997).

Private life
In 1959 he married Éva Koncz. They had three children, András (1960), Ágnes (1963) and Gábor (1964).

He had five grandchildren, Vera (1993), Hanna (1989), Péter (1998), Anna (2000) and Gergő (2002).

Works
 Árkádiában éltem én is. Csokonai élete ("I lived in Arcadia too. The Life of Csokonai") Móra, Budapest, 1966
 Shelley világa ("The World of Shelley") Európa, Budapest, 1971
 Bábel örökében ("Babel’s Legacy"), linguistic popular education , 1972
 Operamesék ("Opera Tales"), Zeneműkiadó, Budapest, 1973
 Byron világa ("Byron’s World") (small monograph), 1975
 Barátod, a zebra ("Your Friend, the Zebra"), illustrated by István Hegedüs, Móra, Budapest, 1978
 Svédország közel van ("Sweden is Close") (youth educational work), 1980
 Vademecum. Szokatlan szavak szótára ("Vademecum. A Dictionary of Unusual Words") Móra, Budapest, 1983
 Vademecum. Szokatlan szavak szótára ("Vademecum. A Dictionary of Unusual Words"), 2nd rev., expanded edition, Móra, Budapest, 1986
 Új operamesék ("New Opera Tales"), Zeneműkiadó, Budapest, 1987
 A forró kutya ("The Hot Dog"), linguistic literature, 1988
 A Könyvek Könyve I. Az Ószövetség. A Bibliából és a Bibliáról ("The Book of Books I. The Old Testament. From and about the Bible"), 1991
 Irodalmi alakok lexikona I. ("Encyclopedia of Literary Figures") vol. I (1992), vol. II (1994)
 Vallási vademecum ("Religious Vademecum") 1992
 Mese, mese, mátka. Mesés kifestő ("Fairy-tale Colouring Book") poem by István Tótfalusi, illustration with drawings by Lívia Elek, Ciceró, Budapest, 1993
 Ki kicsoda az antik mítoszokban? ("Who is Who in the Ancient Myths?") Móra, Budapest, 1993 
 A Könyvek Könyve II. Az Újszövetség ("The Book of Books II. The New Testament"), 1993
 Ki kicsoda Shakespeare világában? ("Who is Who in Shakespeare’s World?"), 1994
 Nyelvi vademecum ("Linguistic Vademecum") 1994
 Ki kicsoda a Bibliában ("Who's Who in the Bible") 1995
 Történelmi vademecum ("Historical Vademecum") 1995
 Barátaink Európában ("Our Friends in Europe") 1996
 Színes szinonimatár ("Colour Thesaurus") 1997
 Magyar nyelvhelyességi kéziszótár A-tól Z-ig ("Hungarian Dictionary of Correct Usage, A to Z") 1997
 Idegen idézetek szótára. Szállóigék, mottók, aforizmák, közmondások görög, latin, angol, francia, német, olasz, spanyol és néhány más nyelven ("Dictionary of Foreign Quotations. A dictionary of Idioms, Mottos, Aphorisms, and Proverbs in Greek, Latin, English, French, German, Italian, Spanish and Some Other Languages") Anno, Budapest, 1998
 Ki kicsoda az antik mítoszokban ("Who is Who in Ancient Myths") expanded edition, Anno, Budapest, 1998
 Kiejtési szótár ("Pronunciation Dictionary"), 1998, 2006
 Irodalmi alakok lexikona ("Dictionary of Literary Figures") expanded edition, Anno, Budapest, 1998
 Kis magyar nyelvklinika ("Little Hungarian Language Clinic") revised, expanded edition, Anno, Budapest, 1999
 Szokatlan szavak szótára ("Dictionary of Unusual Words") 2000
 Idegen szavaink etimológiai szótára ("Etymological Dictionary of our Foreign Words"), 2001
 Magyar szótörténeti szótár ("A Dictionary with the History of Hungarian Words"), 2001
 Idegen szavak magyarul ("Dictionary of Foreign Words in Hungarian"), 2001
 Idegenszó-tár. Idegen szavak értelmező és etimológiai szótára ("Dictionary of Foreign Words. An explanatory and etymological dictionary of foreign words") contribution by Zsuzsanna Windisch, Tinta, Budapest, 2004
 Meseország lakói ("Inhabitants of Fairyland"), General Press, Budapest, 2008
 Halhatatlan hősök ("Immortal Heroes"), General Press, Budapest, 2009
 Klasszikus szócsaládfák. Nyelvünk görög és latin eredetű szavai ("Classic Word-Family Trees. The Greek and Latin Words of our Language"), Tinta, Budapest, 2009
 Magyarító szótár. Idegen szavak magyarul ("Explanatory Dictionary. Dictionary of Foreign Words in Hungarian"), contrib. Gyula Heiszer, Barbara Jójárt, Zsuzsanna Windisch, Tinta, Budapest, 2011
 Irodalmi alakok nagy lexikona I. ("The Unabridged Lexicon of Literary Figures") vol. I, 2010
 Sertések a Bakonyban. Kalandos nyelvtörténet ("Pigs in Bakony Mountain. Adventurous Language History"), Libri, Budapest, 2012
 Idegen szavak alapszótára. 4500 idegen szó magyarázata ("Basic Dictionary of Foreign Words. The Explanations of 4,500 Foreign Words"), Tinta, Budapest, 2015
 44 tévhit a nyelvekről és nyelvünkről ("44 Misconceptions about Languages and Our Language"), Tinta, Budapest, 2016
 A Nibelung-sztori ("The Nibelung Story") Magvető, Budapest, 2017
Nyelvészeti ínyencfalatok ("Linguistic Gourmet Snippets"), Tinta, Budapest, 2017
Vámmentes gondolatok. 838 újkori szállóige 344 neves személytől magyarul és eredeti nyelven, kiejtési tanáccsal ("Duty-free Thoughts. 838 Modern-day Winged Words by 344 Famous People, in Hungarian and in the Original Language, with Pronunciation Advice"), Tinta, Budapest, 2018

Translations into Hungarian
 Aaron Judah: Tales of Teddy Bear, 1964
 Mother Goose Tales, 1966
 B. Mandeville: The Fable of the Bees, 1969
 Hamadani–Hariri, "The Virgin and the Woman" (selection from the Maqama), 1973
 Alan Alexander Milne: Now We Are Six (with Gábor Devecseri and Dezső Tandori), 1973
 S. Fauchereau: Reading American Poetry, 1974
 Britt G. Hallqvist–Ingrid Sjöstrand–Siv Widerberg: "What weighs on your heart," contemporary Swedish children's poems, 1975
 J. R. R. Tolkien. The Hobbit, poem inserts, 1975
 Max Lundgren: "The Boy with the Golden Trousers" (youth novel), 1976
 J. Huizinga: The Autumn of the Middle Ages: A study of the forms of life, thought and art in France and the Netherlands in the fourteenth and fifteenth centuries (with Antal Szerb and István Vas), 1976
 T. Å. Bringsværd: Jørgen Moes vei nr 13, 1977
 Sven Delblanc: "The Castrated," [1977]
 Harry Martinson: Flowering Nettle (with László Lontay), 1977
 Karin Boye: Kallocain (science-fiction novel), 1978
 H. Peterson: Pelle in trouble, 1978
 Lord Byron: Letters and journals (with István Bart and László Gy. Horváth), 1978
 Stig Claesson: "Hilmer Johansson raises his voice", 1979
 Robert Graves: Good-Bye to All That (with Tibor Szilágyi), autobiographical novel, 1979
 R. Nieto: "The Young Lady" (with Zsuzsanna Tomcsányi), novel, 1979
 Lewis Carroll: Through the Looking-Glass (with Tamás Révbíró), Bratislava–Budapest, 1980
 Miroslav Válek: "The enchanted walnut grinder"  (with Ákos Tordon), Budapest–Bratislava, 1980
 G. Arciniegas: The Knight of El Dorado (with Zsuzsa Tomcsányi), 1980
 E. Schwartz: "Enchanted Brothers". Fairy tale play in three acts (with Endre Bojtár), [1980]
 L. Villalonga: Bearn o La sala de las muñecas (with Zsuzsa Tomcsányi), novel, 1982
 Peter Pan (fairy tale novel based on Barrie's work), 1983
 A. E. Housman: a selection of his poems, 1984
 M. Brett: The Moors: Islam in the West (with Tamás Zala), 1985
 Jack London: Before Adam (with Imre Szász), novellas, 1985
 Astrid Lindgren: Ronia, the Robber's Daughter, youth novel, 1986
 Knut Ødegård, poems, selected and translated, 1986
 I. Edelfeldt: "Robin and the invisible ones", fairy tale novel, 1987
 S. Claesson: "Karin, the evil fairy," fairy tale, 1987
 L. Frick: "No more excuses," novel, 1988
 Arthur Conan Doyle: The Poison Belt, 1989
 Aaron Judah: Old and New Tales of Teddy Bear. 1990
 Kurt Vonnegut: Mother Night (with András Békés), novel, 1993
 Vittorio Alfieri: Tragedies, 1994
 Kurt Vonnegut: Fates Worse Than Death, biographical notes from the 1980s (with György Tibor Szántó), 1995
 Astrid Lindgren: Pippi Longstocking, 1997
 Astrid Lindgren: "New pranks of Emil of Lönneberga", 1997
 P. Jekel: The Third Jungle Book, 1997
 Vladimir Nabokov: Pale Fire, 2008
 Anthony Burgess: Nothing Like the Sun, 2011

Translations into English
 Mihály Babits
Jónás könyve – The Book of Jonah, 2004. review
 An Evening Question
 Between autumn and spring
 Dániel’s Song
 For long have Sappho’s days been silent now…
 The Danaids
 The Epilogue of the Lyric Poet
 The mice of Babylon
 21 vers – 21 Poems (Maecenas Kiadó)
Milán Füst: 25 vers – 25 Poems (Maecenas Kiadó)
Gyula Illyés: 29 vers – 29 Poems (Maecenas Kiadó)
Sándor Kányádi: 45 vers – 45 Poems (Maecenas Kiadó)
János Pilinszky: 66 vers – 66 Poems (Maecenas Kiadó)
Lőrinc Szabó: 35 vers – 35 Poems (Maecenas Kiadó)
Sándor Weöres: 62 vers – 62 Poems (Maecenas Kiadó)

Awards and honours
 Children's Book of the Year (1983, 1991, 1993, 1998, 2005)
 Europe Publishers’ Choice Award (1984, 1986, 1991)
 Literary Prize of the Art Fund (1990)
 Book of the Year Award (1993)
 Swedish Literary Fund Prize (1995)
 Gold Cross of Merit of the Republic of Hungary (1996)
 Attila József Prize (1997)
 Tokaj Writers’ Camp Award (1997)
 Milán Füst Award (2014)
 László Wessely Prize (2015)

Sources
 This version of the article Tótfalusi István at Hungarian Wikipedia.
  Ki kicsoda a magyar irodalomban? ("Who is Who in Hungarian Literature?) Tárogató Books, 
 MTI Ki kicsoda 2009. ("Who’s Who 2009"). Ed. Péter Hermann. Budapest: Hungarian News Agency, 2008.

Further reading
  His entry in Contemporary Hungarian Writers 1945–1997

1936 births
2020 deaths
People from Budapest
Hungarian writers
Linguists from Hungary
Hungarian translators
Attila József Prize recipients
Hungarian–English translators